Men of Daring is a 1927 American silent Western film directed by Albert S. Rogell and written by Marion Jackson. The film stars Jack Hoxie, Ena Gregory, Marin Sais, Francis Ford, James T. Kelley and Ernie Adams. The film was released on June 5, 1927, by Universal Pictures.

Cast   
 Jack Hoxie as Jack Benton
 Ena Gregory as Nancy Owen
 Marin Sais as Mother Owen
 Francis Ford as Black Roger
 James T. Kelley as Piney 
 Ernie Adams as Ace
 Robert Milasch as King 
 Bert Lindley as Colonel Murphy
 Bert Appling as Lone Wolf 
 William Malan as Jasper Morton
 Joseph Bennett as David Owen

References

External links
 

1927 films
1920s English-language films
1927 Western (genre) films
Universal Pictures films
Films directed by Albert S. Rogell
American black-and-white films
Silent American Western (genre) films
1920s American films